Hyatt Regency Albuquerque is a 20-story high-rise hotel located at 330 Tijeras Avenue NW in downtown Albuquerque, New Mexico. It was built in 1990 as part of the Albuquerque Plaza mixed-use complex on the south side of Civic Plaza, which also includes the Albuquerque Plaza tower.

The Albuquerque Plaza Complex was designed by Hellmuth, Obata, & Kassabaum and was completed in 1990.

History
The Hyatt Regency Albuquerque was part of the Albuquerque Plaza mixed-use development built by BetaWest Properties, a commercial real estate subsidiary of US West and sister company of the Mountain Bell telephone company. The company was planning a new office tower to replace the old Mountain Bell building, which was originally built in 1953 as a Fedway department store and was notable for having New Mexico's first escalator. Concurrently, the city was planning a major expansion of the Albuquerque Convention Center and convinced BetaWest to add a luxury hotel to the proposed development. In order to secure the hotel deal, the city gave BetaWest $10 million in loans, a seven-year exemption on property taxes for the hotel, and a three-year catering concession for the convention center. Designed by HOK Architects, the planned development consisted of a 22-story office tower and 20-story hotel tower connected by a shared base. Construction began in early 1988 with the demolition of the Mountain Bell building and was completed in the summer of 1990. The total cost of the project was $100 million.

In August 1988, it was announced that Hyatt Hotels had been chosen to operate the hotel, and the grand opening was held two years later on August 1, 1990. With the real estate market struggling in the early 1990s, US West began selling off many of its commercial properties. Both of the Albuquerque Plaza towers were sold to Crescent Real Estate Equities of Fort Worth in 1995 for $69 million. In 2005 the office tower was sold to a local investment group, now under the umbrella of Allegiance Realty of Charlotte, North Carolina. Meanwhile, the Hyatt was sold to an out-of-state investor but went into foreclosure in 2010. In 2013, Allegiance was able to purchase the hotel from Bank of America, putting both towers back under the same ownership.

Architecture
The tower, roughly square in plan with angular projections, is situated at the north end of the block and originally contained 395 hotel rooms. However, the hotel currently houses 382 rooms due to in-house renovations over the last decade. It rises 18 stories above a two-story base which is shared with the Albuquerque Plaza office tower. The first floor contains a retail promenade, while the second floor houses banquet and conference rooms. The complex was designed by HOK Architects and is an example of postmodern architecture. It is constructed from reinforced concrete with pink granite trim, and both towers are capped with distinctive pyramidal roofs which contain mechanical equipment.

Amenities
The hotel is styled with Southwestern decor and offers rooms with a mountain or city view. Forque Kitchen and Bar, the onsite restaurant, offers fine dining, a standard cafe, and serves as the lobby lounge. Other amenities include a heated rooftop pool, hot tubs, and a 24-hour attended gym. The  conference center contains four ballrooms, three boardrooms and 22 meeting rooms.

See also
List of tallest buildings in Albuquerque

References

External links 
 Hyatt Regency Albuquerque (Official site)
 

Hotel buildings completed in 1990
Economy of Albuquerque, New Mexico
Hyatt Hotels and Resorts
Skyscraper hotels in Albuquerque, New Mexico
Twin towers
HOK (firm) buildings
1990 establishments in New Mexico